Alex M. LaFollette (a.k.a. La Follet) (1845-July 25, 1927) was a Republican member of the Oregon Legislative Assembly representing Salem, Oregon, and a farmer. He served in the house of representatives (1887 and 1903) and in the state senate from 1915 to 1925. In the 1919 and 1921 sessions in the senate, he served as an independent.

LaFollette was born in Indiana in 1845, moved to California in 1853, and to Oregon in 1859. He became wealthy through his farming, specifically through commercial fruit production. He was known as a steadfast opponent of taxation. He died in his home after an illness of several weeks.

References

Republican Party Oregon state senators
Republican Party members of the Oregon House of Representatives
Oregon Independents
People from Indiana
People from California
1845 births
Farmers from Oregon
Year of death unknown
1927 deaths